The 1979–80 Nationalliga A season was the 42nd season of the Nationalliga A, the top level of ice hockey in Switzerland. Eight teams participated in the league, and EHC Arosa won the championship.

Standings

External links
 Championnat de Suisse 1979/80

Swiss
National League (ice hockey) seasons
1979–80 in Swiss ice hockey